Dhina (also credited as Dheena) (born on 15 January 1966) is an Indian film and television series composer from Tamil Nadu, India.

Biography and career
Dhina first worked as an assistant musician under popular composer G. K. Venkatesh, later being engaged by Maestro Ilaiyaraaja as a music conductor. He later became a music director for several Tele serials scoring for the title tracks. Some of his popular title scores for the serials include Chitthi, Annamalai, Ninaivugal, Payanam, Nambikkai, Chellamay, Metti Oli among others. It was the Raadhika produced hugely popular teleseries Chitthi that gave Dhina a very big break.

Dhina's first big break in Tamil cinema came through a comedy film Middle Class Madhavan released in 2001. Since then, he has scored music for various films in various languages including Telugu and Kannada films.

Dhina is debuting in the upcoming film Soozhnilai as an actor.

Political career
On 23rd Aug 2018 he joined T. T. V. Dhinakaran's Amma Makkal Munetra Kazhagam
Now, he is with BJP and has been appointed as the state chief of Overseas and other states Tamil development wing.

Filmography

Films

Television

 1999 Maru Piravi
 1999 Chithi
 1999 Chinna Papa Periya Papa
 1999 Dhik Dhik Dhik
 2000 Nimmathi Ungal Choice V - Manasatchi
 2000 Pushpanjali
 2000 Indira
 2001 Vaazhkkai
 2001 Nambikkai
 2001 Choti Maa Ek Anokha Bandhan (Hindi remake of Chithi)
 2001 Kaveri
 2001 Jee Boom Baa
 2001 Alaigal
 2001 Vaazhnthu Kaattugiren
 2002 Metti Oli
 2002 Gopi
 2002 Annamalai
 2002 Mandhira Vaasal
 2002 Police Diary
 2003 Payanam
 2003 Sorgam
 2003 Marupiravi
 2003 Nee Naan Aval
 2004 Manaivi
 2005 Aarthi
 2005 Sruthi
 2006 Ninaivugal
 2008 Gokulathil Seethai
 2009 Chellamey
 2011 Thulasi
 2012 Bommlattam
 2012 Thyagam
 2014 Maragatha Veenai
 2015 Aadhira
 2017 Nandini
 2017 Vidhi
 2019 Pandavar Illam 
 2019 Chocolate
 2020 Chithi 2
 2022 Peaky Blinders Finale

Awards 
He has been awarded the Kalaimamani award by the Government of Indian state Tamil Nadu in 2021.

References 

People from Coimbatore
Tamil singers
Tamil film score composers
Tamil playback singers
Living people
1966 births
Indian male playback singers
Male film score composers